Hendrikje Geerts Meilofs Doelen (June 1, 1784–December 10, 1847) was a Dutch serial killer.

Poisonings 
On May 7, 1819, the farmwife Hendrikje Doelen married the almost six years older Aaldert Mulder in the Drenthe town of De Wijk. Both were poor day laborers. In 1827, both were admitted to the district's poorhouse. Suddenly, in 1845 several people mysteriously died. First of all, on April 7, her husband Aaldert and an old woman named Jantje Wichers, who was living with the couple, died. A few days later, the three children of Arend Hut, who also lived in the poorhouse, became ill after eating oatmeal pulp that they had received from Hendrikje Doelen. Half a year later, on October 14, her neighbour Grietje van Buren died after eating pancakes made by Doelen. Her daughter, Evertje, also became seriously ill after eating those same pancakes and died ten months later on August 9, 1846.

Arrest and trial 
Doelen was suspected of murdering the persons mentioned. After an investigation it was established that Wichers probably died from a natural death, but both the husband and Grietje van Buren were diagnosed with the presence of arsenic. Because no legal proof could be provided for her husband's murder, she was finally sentenced to death on January 15, 1847 for the murder of Van Buren by the provincial court of Assen.

Doelen denied her guilt at the hearing. But the Supreme Court rejected her cassation request, she acknowledged her guilt in her pardon request. She killed her husband because of the marital quarreling and her neighbour and daughter because of spite. The Supreme Court advised negatively about the petition, but the then minister of justice Marinus Willem de Jonge of Campensnieuwland gave a positive advice, also in view of her age. King William II granted her clemency by royal order on November 14, 1847.

On December 2, 1847, she was displayed for half an hour with the noose on the scaffold in Assen. The death penalty was changed to a prison sentence of 20 years. She died, however, after eight days, on December 10, 1847 in the women's prison of Gouda.

Bibliography 
 Koetsveld van Ankeren, J. van Hendrikje Geerts Meilofs Targets, widow of Aaldert Mulder: a test of remarkable criminal procedure in respect of poisoning. Schoonhoven, 1847
 Ruller, Sibo van Genade voor recht: Gratification to sentenced to death in the Netherlands 1806-1870 ed. De Bataafse Leeuw, Amsterdam, 1987, 
 Zeijden, JR van der Gifmoord in the District: Our Value, volume 9 (p. 198-204), ed. Drentse Historische Vereniging, Assen, 1989

See also
List of serial killers by country

References

1784 births
1847 deaths
Dutch female serial killers
Dutch people convicted of murder
Filicides
Mariticides
People from De Wolden
Poisoners
Prisoners sentenced to death by the Netherlands
Serial killers who died in prison custody